Kong Sizhen (孔四貞; 1641 – after 1681), was a Chinese military commander and princess.

Biography 
Kong Sizhen was the daughter of Kong Youde (died 1652), a Chinese military commander awarded with the title of prince for his service to the Qing dynasty. 

She was one of the only survivors of an attack by Southern Ming general Li Dingguo. 

In 1660 she married Sun Yanling, military governor in Guangxi, whose father was one of her father's lieutenants. 

Her spouse joined the rebellion of Wu Sangui, which caused him to be deposed by his army. Kong Sizhen became his successor by 1677, which was confirmed by the Emperor in 1676, a very unusual position for a woman in Qing dynasty China. She kept her position until the end of the rebellion.

References 
 Lily Xiao Hong Lee, Clara Lau, A.D. Stefanowska: Biographical Dictionary of Chinese Women: v. 1: The Qing Period, 1644–1911

1641 births
17th-century Chinese people
Qing dynasty generals
Women in 17th-century warfare
Chinese princesses
Women in war in China
17th-century Chinese women
Year of death unknown